is a terminal on the Hankyu Railway Minoo Line in Minoh, Osaka Prefecture, Japan. Trains depart regularly, about every 10 minutes. During autumn, spring and other festival events the Minoo line becomes particularly crowded with sightseeing visitors.

An Eki Stamp is available at this station (obtained 22 November 2019)

Layout
There are two platforms with two tracks on the ground level.

Line 1 is usually used for trains for Ishibashi, however used for trains for Osaka in the rush hours.  Line 2 is used for trains for Ishibashi in the rush hours and the outing seasons.

Surroundings
Minoo River (箕面川)
Minoo Onsen (箕面温泉)
Ryūan-ji (瀧安寺)

Adjacent station

See also
List of railway stations in Japan

External links
Mino-o (Hankyu Railway)

Railway stations in Osaka Prefecture
Stations of Hankyu Railway
Railway stations in Japan opened in 1910